Self-abuse may refer to:
 Self-harm, the intentional, direct injuring of one's own body without suicidal intentions
 Self-destructive behaviour, patterns of behaviour to inflict metaphorical or literal harm on oneself
 Self-inflicted wound, harming oneself without psychological problems to take advantage of being injured
 A derogatory euphemism for masturbation

See also
 Algolagnia, deriving sexual pleasure and stimulation from physical pain
 Abuse § Self-abuse
 Violence § Self-directed violence